KHTI (103.9 FM, Hot 103.9) is a commercial radio station licensed to Lake Arrowhead, California, broadcasting to the Riverside-San Bernardino, California, area since 1978. KHTI airs a Hot AC music format.  It is owned by All Pro Broadcasting, a corporation headed by the estate of Pro Football Hall of Fame member Willie Davis, which also owns several other businesses. KHTI is a sister station to KATY-FM in Temecula, California.

History
In 1978, 103.9 signed on as KBON with a beautiful music format to represent the rapidly growing Riverside-San Bernardino radio market's full potential. The signal was strong enough to reach the Morongo Basin and the Victor Valley areas.

In 1984, KBON changed to an adult contemporary format under the name K-104.

In 1987, KBON again changed formats to traditional oldies.

On September 1, 1992, KBON became KCKC-FM, making 103.9 a full AM/FM simulcast with KCKC 1350 AM. KCKC had been broadcasting in San Bernardino for 25 years (from 1966 to 1992) with a country music format.

On October 31, 1993, KCKC-FM became KABE as it changed to a simulcast of KACE (also on 103.9 FM), which broadcast to the nearby Los Angeles area. Covering most of Los Angeles and the Inland Empire, the simulcast briefly experimented with a hip hop/R&B format as "The New V103.9".

On October 2, 1994, KABE became KAEV, commensurate with Willie Davis learning that sister station WLUM-FM in Milwaukee had personalities playing uncensored tracks and cursing on-air in late night FCC safe harbor hours, along with personal disapproval of the hardcore rap becoming prevalent in hip-hop. After a transitional format of lighter 'positive' rap, on January 1, 1995, KAEV became KCXX and ended its simulcast with KACE by flipping to alternative rock as "X103.9", with the first song played being "Closer" by Nine Inch Nails (this matched WLUM's post-1995 programming direction). 2015 marked KCXX's 20th (and, as it would turn out, last) year as an alternative station.

On December 21, 2015, KCXX announced it would end its alternative format the following morning after two decades, citing falling ratings and increased Internet music services for the reasoning behind the change. On December 22, 2015, at 7 a.m., after playing "Snuff" by Slipknot, KCXX flipped to Rhythmic Hot AC as "Hot 103.9." The first song on "Hot" was "Time of Our Lives" by Pitbull. The station changed its call sign to KHTI on the same day as the flip. An automated alt-rock format continued as a separate mobile app under the former X103.9 brand, but the mobile app has been removed from app store from Google and Apple as of May 2018.

As of fall 2018, the station has reverted to a more conventional hot adult contemporary format.

References

External links
Hot 103.9 official website

KHTI Call Sign History

HTI
Hot adult contemporary radio stations in the United States
Mass media in San Bernardino County, California
Radio stations established in 1978
1978 establishments in California